Contribution or Contribute may refer to:

Contribution (album), by Mica Paris (1990)
"Contribution" (song), title song from the album
Contribution (law), an agreement between defendants in a suit to apportion liability
Contributions, a vital goal of fundraising
Contribution, a 1976 album by Shawn Phillips
Contribution margin, the selling price per unit minus the variable cost per unit

See also 
Adobe Contribute, former web-editing software